Peter P. Jones was a photographer and filmmaker in the United States. He established the Peter P. Jones Film Company in Chicago in 1914 and filmed African American subjects including vaudeville acts and the 1915 National Half Century Exposition and Lincoln Jubilee. He also filmed community documentaries, chronicling contemporary African American life and social organizations.

According to a front page story in the Chicago Defender, Jones established his film company with funding from South American investors. The company had an office at 3849 State Street. His 1916 film Re-Birth of a Nation was a response to The Birth of a Nation. He later established the Seminole Film Producing Company in New York City, but it never completed its first film project, Shadows and Sunshine, an adaptation of a story by Jesse Shipp.

Jones photographed Booker T. Washington. He also photographed Henry O. Tanner, Bert Williams, Aida Overton Walker, and W. E. B. Du Bois.

Filmography
The Troubles of Sambo and Dinah
50 Years of Freedom
Dawn of Truth (for the Honor of the 8th)The SlackerThe Accidental RulerRe-Birth of a Nation'' (1916)

References

Filmmakers from Illinois
Photographers from Illinois
Year of birth missing (living people)
Living people
African-American film producers
African-American film directors